The Winnipeg Cyclone was a professional basketball club based in Winnipeg, Manitoba that competed in the International Basketball Association from 1995 to 2001. The Cyclone played its home games at the Winnipeg Convention Centre (dubbed the "Wind Tunnel"). However, the Cyclone did not enjoy significant popularity, usually playing before sparse crowds. The club was backed largely by local businessman Earl Barish.

Notable players

The Cyclone had several recognizable names on the roster and coaching staff during the franchise's short existence. From 1998-2000, Former NBA star Darryl Dawkins served as a players coach for the franchise, winning Co-Coach of the Year for the 1999 season along with Mansfield Hawks coach Kevin Mackey. "Hoop Dreams" subject Arthur Agee played on the team for a brief stint, as well as Andrell Hoard, who won back-to-back Most Valuable Player honors in 1998 and 1999.

End of Franchise 

After the 2001 season, it was announced that the IBA would cease operations. League leaders made the decision after failing to acquire commitments for the upcoming 2002 season from several franchises, having to push back the application deadline on several occasions. Four teams from the IBL (Dakota Wizards, Fargo Beez, Sioux Falls Skyforce, and Saskatchewan Hawks) would go on to join the Continental Basketball Association's eight-team expansion. For a time, Winnipeg was rumored to be joining the CBA as well, but ultimately decided against the move. In 6 seasons, the Cyclone won 90  games while losing 108. Darryl Dawkins finished as the franchise's winningest coach, tallying a 37-33 record in his two years as the head of the Cyclone.

Basketball in Winnipeg 
 
Since the club folded, there have been no professional basketball teams based in Winnipeg. In 2013, the Canadian Basketball League, in conjunction with Cosmos Sports, conducted a feasibility study that showed Winnipeg could successfully host a professional basketball franchise if chosen. After a meeting with potential owners later in the year, it was decided that there wasn't enough interest to reach the expansion minimum of eight teams. In 2022, it was reported that Winnipeg was being looked at for an expansion team in the Canadian Elite Basketball League.

Franchise Record

References  

Defunct basketball teams in Canada
Sports teams in Winnipeg
Basketball teams established in 1995
Basketball teams disestablished in 2001